Gopal Palpodi or Gopal Tooth Powder is a brand of tooth powder, popular in Tamil Nadu state of India. It is also popular among the Tamil diaspora in Sri Lanka, Malaysia and  Singapore .

The brand is manufactured by the Madurai-based S.P.S. Jayam and Company. It is prepared with a combination of herbs. The trademark "Gopal Tooth Powder" was first registered on 30 April 1947.

References 

Dentifrices
Personal care brands